The Coronation Bridge, also known as the Sevoke Roadway Bridge, in West Bengal, India, spans across the Teesta River, connecting the districts of Darjeeling and Kalimpong. The bridge is a part of the National Highway 17 [NH 31 (old)]. This bridge runs parallel to Sevoke Railway Bridge which is around 2 km away from coronation bridge in River Teesta.

It was named to commemorate the coronation of King George VI and Queen Elizabeth in 1937 and was completed in 1941 at a cost of Rs 6 lakhs. The foundation stone of the bridge was laid by John Anderson, the-then Governor of Bengal in 1937.

Locals call the bridge Baghpool, meaning tiger bridge, because of the two tiger statues (bagh actually means tiger) at one entrance of the bridge. 
John Chambers, the last British executive Engineer of the Darjeeling Division Public works department (PWD), carried out the design, drawing and planning of the bridge. Messrs J.C. Gammon, from Bombay, was the contractor. The bridge was built on the Reinforced Concrete system. Since it was not possible to obtain support from the Teesta river bed due to the depth and current of water, the entire bridge was supported by a fixed arch, which had its two ends fixed on rock layers on either side of the river.

References 

Bridges completed in 1941
Buildings and structures in Darjeeling district
Transport in Siliguri
Bridges in West Bengal
1941 establishments in British India
Road bridges in India
20th-century architecture in India